Cursed Seat is a Russian horror film directed by Nadezhda Mikhalkova. The premiere of  film in Russia took place on November 1, 2018.

Plot
Among schoolchildren there is a legend about the so-called  lost place, according to which everyone who buys a movie ticket to this place is waiting for death. None of the guys believe in it, but a series of brutal murders makes young people think, as a result of which they begin their own investigation.

Cast
 Alexey Dyakin as Anton
 Anna Mikhalkova as Maria
 Irina Martynenko as Katya
 Nikita Yelenev as Roma
 Alexey Martynov as Yura

Reviews 
 The Hollywood Reporter Russia:  Cursed Seat can not be called an unambiguous success. it has a number of shortcomings and problems that are worth paying attention to. Nevertheless, for the Russian genre picture the result is worthy.

References

External links 
 
  Cursed Seat at the KinoPoisk
 Cursed Seat at the   ČSFD

2018 films
2010s Russian-language films
Russian horror thriller films
2018 horror thriller films
2018 directorial debut films